is the 12th studio album by Japanese singer/songwriter Chisato Moritaka, released on May 21, 1998 by zetima. The album was produced by veteran musician Harry Hosono and features cover versions of two of his songs. In addition, it includes "Summer Beach", a re-recording of "Natsu no Umi" from Moritaka's 1992 album Rock Alive. The album was also the first album since Mite to be released on LP format. During the time of the album's release, One Up Music merged with YJ Sounds to form zetima, and the label's distribution rights were changed from Warner Music Japan to Sony Music Entertainment Japan.

The album reached No. 10 on Oricon's albums chart and sold over 62,000 copies.

Track listing 
All lyrics are written by Chisato Moritaka, except where indicated; all music is composed and arranged by Harry Hosono, except where indicated.

Personnel 
 Chisato Moritaka – vocals, additional drums (1, 5, 9), steel drum (7)
 Harry Hosono – all instruments, vocals (1, 5–6)
 Miharu Koshi – backing vocals (2), additional instruments (4)

Charts

References

External links 
  (Chisato Moritaka)
  (Up-Front Works)
 
 

1998 albums
Chisato Moritaka albums
Japanese-language albums
Zetima albums